Can't Be Heaven (also known as Forever Together) is a 1999 American comedy-drama film directed by Richard Friedman. The film stars Ralph Macchio and Bryan Burke. The film was loosely based on the 1968 movie Blackbeard's Ghost.

Plot
Danny (Bryan Burke), is a young student in middle school. He starts to develop feelings for his best friend, Julie (Michelle Trachtenberg). However a new student by the name of Archie (Michael Galeota) comes in and sweeps Julie off her feet. Danny flees to the graveyard where his father is buried and talks to him about his problems. He soon comes across Hubbie the Ghost (Ralph Macchio), who helps Danny with his girl problems. As a former living person from the 1930s, Hubbie, gives Danny his advice. The advice repeatedly backfires, always leaving Danny depressed. Danny soon learns that Hubbie once had a former lover before dying in an accident. Danny and Julie end up together at a school dance and Hubbie re-connects with his former love with the help of Danny.

Cast

 Bryan Burke as Danny
 Ralph Macchio as Hubbie
 Diane Ladd as Nana Gina
 Rachel Ticotin as Maggie
 Michelle Trachtenberg as Julie
 Garry Marshall as Pawn Shop Owner
 Kaley Cuoco as Teresa Powers
 Michael Galeota as Archie
 Matt McCoy as Mike
 Rachel Robinson as Miss Viola
 Shayna Fox as Shirley
 Mike Alaimo as Father Micelli 
 Ralph Manza as Anzio
 Annie Abbott as Miss Wisser
 Siri Baruc as Young Nona Gina
 Bryan Robinson as Edgar
 Jamie Williams as Phil

Releases
The film was first released in 1999 on DVD by Ardustry Home Entertainment, and re-released in 2009 by Mill Creek Entertainment.

Reception
TV Guide praised the film as an imaginative and refreshing look at adolescent romance, writing that it was "an amusing coming of age story far above the run-of-the-mill teen fare churned out in abundance".

References

External links

1999 films
1999 comedy-drama films
American comedy-drama films
American teen comedy films
American romantic comedy films
1990s English-language films
1990s American films